Papalotla de Xicohténcatl is a municipality in Tlaxcala in south-eastern Mexico.

References

Municipalities of Tlaxcala